The Military Ordinariate of Belgium is a Latin Church military ordinariate of the Catholic Church. Immediately exempt to the Holy See, it provides pastoral care to Catholics serving in the Belgian Armed Forces and their families.

History
It was established as a military vicariate on 7 September 1957, and elevated to a military ordinariate on 21 July 1986. The Military Ordinary's seat is located at the Co-cathedral of Saint Jacques-sur-Coudenberg (Sint-Jacob op de Koudenbergkerk) in Brussels, Belgium. The post of Military Ordinary is vested in the Archbishop of Mechelen and Primate of Belgium.

Office holders

Military vicars
 Jozef-Ernest van Roey (appointed 1957 – died 6 August 1961)
 Leo Jozef Suenens (appointed 24 November 1961 – retired 1979)
 Godfried Danneels (appointed 15 September 1980 – became military ordinary 21 July 1986)

Military ordinaries
 Godfried Danneels (appointed 21 July 1986 – retired 27 February 2010)
 André-Joseph Léonard ( appointed 27 February 2010 – retired 6 November 2015)
 Josef De Kesel (incumbent, appointed 6 November 2015 – )

References

 Army Chaplaincy
 Military Ordinariate of Belgium  (Catholic-Hierarchy)
 Bisdom bij de Krijgsmacht / Diocèse aux Forces armées belges (Belgium) (GCatholic.org)

Roman Catholic dioceses in Belgium
Military ordinariates